IEC 61400 is an international standard published by the International Electrotechnical Commission (IEC) regarding wind turbines.

Purpose and function 
IEC 61400 is a set of design requirements made to ensure that wind turbines are appropriately engineered against damage from hazards within the planned lifetime. The standard concerns most aspects of the turbine life from site conditions before construction, to turbine components being tested, assembled and operated.

Wind turbines are capital intensive, and are usually purchased before they are being erected and commissioned.

Some of these standards provide technical conditions verifiable by an independent, third party, and as such are necessary in order to make business agreements so wind turbines can be financed and erected.

IEC started standardizing international certification on the subject in 1995, and the first standard appeared in 2001.

The common set of standards sometimes replace the various national standards, forming a basis for global certification.

Small wind turbines are defined as being of up to 200 m2 swept area and a somewhat simplified IEC 61400-2 standard addresses these. It is also possible to use the IEC 61400-1 standard for turbines of less than 200 m2 swept area.

The standards for loads and noise are used in the development of prototypes at the Østerild Wind Turbine Test Field.

Harmonization

In the U.S., standards are intended to be compatible with IEC standards, and some parts of 61400 are required documentation.

The U.S. National Renewable Energy Laboratory participates in IEC standards development work, and tests equipment according to these standards. For U.S. offshore turbines however, more standards are needed, and the most important are :
 ISO 19900, General requirements for offshore structures 
 ISO 19902, Fixed steel offshore structures 
 ISO 19903, Fixed concrete offshore structures 
 ISO 19904-1, Floating offshore structures – mono-hulls, semisubmersibles and spars 
 ISO 19904-2, Floating offshore structures - tension-leg platforms 
 API RP 2A-WSD, Recommended practice for planning, designing and constructing fixed offshore steel platforms - working stress design.
In Canada, the previous national standards were outdated and impeded the wind industry, and they were updated and harmonized with 61400 by the Canadian Standards Association with several modifications.

An update for IEC 61400 is scheduled for 2016.

For small wind turbines the global industry has been working towards harmonisation of certification requirements with a "test once, certify everywhere" objective. Considerable co-operation has been taking place between UK, USA, and more recently Japan, Denmark and other countries so that the IEC 61400-2 standard as interpreted within e.g. the MCS certification scheme (of UK origin) is interoperable with the USA (for example where it corresponds to an AWEA small wind turbine standard) and other countries.

Wind Turbine Generator (WTG) classes
Wind turbines are designed for specific conditions. During the construction and design phase assumptions are made about the wind climate that the wind turbines will be exposed to. Turbine wind class is just one of the factors needing consideration during the complex process of planning a wind power plant. Wind classes determine which turbine is suitable for the normal wind conditions of a particular site. Turbine classes are determined by three parameters - the average wind speed, extreme 50-year gust, and turbulence.

Turbulence intensity quantifies how much the wind varies typically within 10 minutes. Because the fatigue loads of a number of major components in a wind turbine are mainly caused by turbulence, the knowledge of how turbulent a site is of crucial importance. Normally the wind speed increases with increasing height due to vertical wind shear. In flat terrain the wind speed increases logarithmically with height. In complex terrain the wind profile is not a simple increase and additionally a separation of the flow might occur, leading to heavily increased turbulence.

The extreme wind speeds are based on the 3 second average wind speed. Turbulence is measured at 15 m/s wind speed. This is the definition in IEC 61400-1 edition 2.

For U.S. waters however, several hurricanes have already exceeded wind class Ia with speeds above the 70 m/s (156 mph), and efforts are being made to provide suitable standards. In 2021, TÜV SÜD developed a standard to simulate a new wind class T1 for tropical cyclones.

List of IEC 61400 parts
IEC 61400-1:2005+AMD1:2010 Design requirements
IEC 61400-2:2013 Small wind turbines
IEC 61400-3:2009 Design requirements for offshore wind turbines
IEC 61400-4:2012 Design requirements for wind turbine gearboxes
IEC 61400-6:2020 Tower and foundation design requirements
IEC 61400-11:2012 Acoustic noise measurement techniques
IEC 61400-12-1:2005 Power performance measurements of electricity producing wind turbines
IEC 61400-12-2:2013/COR1:2016 Power performance of electricity-producing wind turbines based on nacelle anemometry / Corrigendum 1 
IEC 61400-12-1:2017 Power performance measurements of electricity producing wind turbines / Remote sensing devices like Sodar & lidar measurements
IEC 61400-13:2015 Measurement of mechanical loads
IEC TS 61400-14:2005 Declaration of apparent sound power level and tonality values
IEC 61400-21:2008 Measurement and assessment of power quality characteristics of grid connected wind turbines
IEC 61400-22:2010 Conformity testing and certification (IEC 61400-22:2010 was withdrawn on 2018-08-31, and replaced with the deliverables for the wind sector (WE-OMC) contained in the IECRE Conformity Assessment System.)
IEC 61400-23:2014 Full-scale structural testing of rotor blades
IEC 61400-24:2010 Lightning protection
IEC 61400-25-1:2006 Communications for monitoring and control of wind power plants - Overall description of principles and models
IEC 61400-25-2:2015 Communications for monitoring and control of wind power plants - Information models
IEC 61400-25-3:2015 Communications for monitoring and control of wind power plants - Information exchange models
IEC 61400-25-4:2008 Communications for monitoring and control of wind power plants - Mapping to communication profile
IEC 61400-25-5:2006 Communications for monitoring and control of wind power plants - Conformance testing
IEC 61400-25-6:2010 Communications for monitoring and control of wind power plants - Logical node classes and data classes for condition monitoring
IEC TS 61400-26-1:2011 Time-based availability for wind turbine generating systems
IEC TS 61400-26-2:2014 Production-based availability for wind turbines
IEC 61400-27-1:2015 Electrical simulation models - Wind turbines

See also 
 IEC 61400-25

References

External links 
 
 IEC 61400 Wind turbines - All parts

 
61400
Electric power transmission systems
Electric power distribution
Wind turbines